Liceo Mirella Catalán Urzúa is a Chilean high school located in Paredones, Cardenal Caro Province, Chile. It is named after a former mayor of Paredones.

References 

Educational institutions with year of establishment missing
Secondary schools in Chile
Schools in Cardenal Caro Province